Veronika (publicly capitalized as VERONIKA) is a singer and songwriter. She began her music career in 2012 and her single Ain't Russian Doll received regular airplay throughout the United States including reaching No.1 on YouTube charts after receiving more than two million hits in less than one month. The video also received airplay on MTV.com.

Singles

 2013, ToyBoy
 2013, Sing
 2013, CameRA
 2012, Ain't Russian Doll
 2012, C.I.A.

Music videos

 2013, CameRA
 2013, C.I.A.
 2013, ToyBoy
 2013, Ain't Russian Doll

References

External links
 Official Website of VERONIKA
 Veronika Vevo Channel

21st-century Ukrainian women singers
Living people
Year of birth missing (living people)